The mixed poomsae pairs competition of the taekwondo events at the 2019 Pan American Games took place on July 28 at the Polideportivo Callao.

Results

Mexico won tiebreak

References

External links
Results

Taekwondo at the 2019 Pan American Games